Boubacar Sarr (born 20 July 1951) is a Senegalese former professional footballer who played as a striker. In France, he played for Toulon, Marseille, Cannes, Paris Saint-Germain and Martigues, and in the United States for New Jersey City FC.

Personal life
Throughout his career he was referred to as Sarr Boubacar while his real name is Boubacar Sarr with "Sarr" being his surname. His nickname is "Locotte".

He is the father of the French youth footballer Mouhamadou-Naby Sarr.

Honours
Marseille
 Coupe de France: 1975–76
 Division 2: 1983–84

PSG
 Coupe de France: 1981–82, 1982–83

References

External links
Profile
Profile

1951 births
Living people
Footballers from Dakar
Association football forwards
Senegalese footballers
Serer sportspeople
SC Toulon players
Olympique de Marseille players
AS Cannes players
Paris Saint-Germain F.C. players
FC Martigues players
Ligue 1 players
Ligue 2 players
1986 African Cup of Nations players
1994 African Cup of Nations managers
Senegalese football managers
Senegalese expatriate footballers
Senegalese expatriate sportspeople in France
Senegalese expatriate sportspeople in the United States
Expatriate footballers in France
Expatriate soccer players in the United States